The Muzaffarpur–Hajipur section is an electrified double railway line connecting Muzaffarpur to Hajipur in the Indian state of Bihar. The  line passes through the plains of North Bihar and the Gangetic Plain in Bihar.

Electrification
Former Railway Minister Laloo Prasad Yadav announced the electrification of Barauni–Samastipur–Muzaffarpur–Hajipur line and Muzaffarpur–Gorakhpur line (via Hajipur, Raxaul and Sitamarhi) in the Rail Budget 2008. The electrification began in 2011 and was completed in 2014.

Stations

Speed limit
The Barauni–Samastipur–Muzaffarpur–Hajipur line is not an A-Class line of Indian Railways. So maximum speed is restricted to 130 km/h, which was electrified in December 2014 and the doubling work was in progress which is completed between Muzaffarpur Junction to Bhagwanpur railway station .

Sidings and workshops
 Kanti Thermal Power Station, Muzaffarpur
 Bharat Wagon Engineering Limited, Muzaffarpur
 Major Freight Terminal at Narayanpur Anant
 Bharat Petroleum Siding, Narayanpur Anant
 FCI Siding at Narayanpur Anant
 PSC Sleeper Siding at Sarai
 DEMU maintenance depot at Sonepur

See also
 Barauni–Gorakhpur, Raxaul and Jainagar lines
 Samastipur–Muzaffarpur section
 Barauni–Samastipur section
 
 
 East Central Railway zone

References

5 ft 6 in gauge railways in India
Railway lines in Bihar

Transport in Hajipur